Street Food Around The World is a reality television series first aired on French travel channel Voyage in 2012. Now it is broadcasting on Fox Life and National Geographic Channel. The show follows host Ishai Golan, exploring street food of a city around the world in each episode.

List of episodes

Season 1
 S01E01 - Istanbul, Turkey
 S01E02 - Mumbai, India
 S01E03 - Haifa, Israel
 S01E04 - Paris, France
 S01E05 - Bangkok, Thailand
 S01E06 - Hanoi, Vietnam
 S01E07 - Marrakech, Morocco
 S01E08 - Amsterdam, Netherlands
 S01E09 - Naples, Italy
 S01E10 - Tbilisi, Georgia
 S01E11 - Vienna, Austria
 S01E12 - Mexico City, Mexico
 S01E13 - Best of Season 1

Season 2
 S02E01 - Rio de Janeiro, Brazil
 S02E02 - Athens, Greece
 S02E03 - New York City, United States (part 1)
 S02E04 - New York City, United States (part 2)
 S02E05 - Lima, Peru
 S02E06 - Ramla, Israel
 S02E07 - Prague, Czech Republic
 S02E08 - Palermo, Italy
 S02E09 - Seoul, South Korea
 S02E10 - Manila, Philippines
 S02E11 - Marseille, France
 S02E12 - Nazareth, Israel
 S02E13 - Best of Season 2

Guest Appearance
Season 1:
 Chef Vedat Başaran
 Chef Vicky Ratnani
 Chef Yisrael Aharoni
 Food Critic Gilles Pudlowski
 Chef McDang
 Chef Bien Duc Nguyen
 Culinary Guide Habiba Errajai
 Food Writer Johannes van Dam
 Chef Don Alfonso
 Culinary Guide Ruth T. Alegria
 Chef Mónica Patiño
Season 2:
 Chef Flavia Quaresma
 Chef Vangelis Driskas
 Chef Rocco DiSpirito
 Chef Gastón Acurio
Former Mayor Yoel Lavi
 Chef Bonetta Dell'oglio
 Chef Edward Young-min Kwon
 Chef Rolando Laudico
 Chef Ludovic Turac
 Chef Elias Mattar

Awards
 Best International Program, 2013 Tasty Awards.

Israeli reality television series
Channel 2 (Israeli TV channel) original programming
2012 Israeli television series debuts
Food reality television series